Bedřich Fritta (19 September 1906, Višňová – 8 November 1944, Auschwitz) was a Czech-Jewish artist and cartoonist. Before the war, Fritta worked as an illustrator and graphic designer in Prague under the pseudonym Fritz Taussig. In the 1930s, he devoted himself to political caricature and provided input for the satirical magazine Simplicus.

Fritta was imprisoned in multiple Nazi concentration camps during World War II; some of his sketches of life in the camps survive. He was eventually deported to Auschwitz, where he died. His wife, Johanna, died of typhus in Auchwitz. Their son, Tomáš ("Tommy"), survived the Holocaust. Fritta made a picture book for his son's third birthday, which was recovered after the liberation of the Theresienstadt concentration camp. Some of Fritta's surviving works are held by the Jewish Museum Berlin and the Jewish Museum of Switzerland.

References

External links
 About Bedřich Fritta in an online exhibition at Yad Vashem website. 

1906 births
1944 deaths
Czech cartoonists
Czech illustrators
Czech graphic designers
Czech caricaturists
Czech Jews who died in the Holocaust
Theresienstadt Ghetto prisoners
Czech people who died in Auschwitz concentration camp
Jewish artists
People from Liberec District